The London Film Critics' Circle Award for Foreign Language of the Year in an annual award given by the London Film Critics' Circle.

List of winners

Film awards for Best Foreign Language Film
Foreign Language